{{Infobox football club season
| club = Heart of Midlothian
| season = 2019–20
| chairman = Ann Budge
|  manager  =Craig Levein(until 31 October 2019)Austin MacPhee(31 October – 7 December 2019)Daniel Stendel(10 December 2019 – 21 June 2020))
|  mgrtitle = 
| stadium    = Tynecastle Park
| league = Premiership
| league result = 12th (relegated)
| cup2 = League Cup
| cup2 result = Semi-finals
| cup1 = Scottish Cup
| cup1 result = Runners-up
| league topscorer   =Steven Naismith (4)Sean Clare (4)
| season topscorer   =Craig Halkett (7)
| highest attendance =19,313 vs HibernianPremiership26 December 2019
| lowest attendance   =7,299 vs StenhousemuirLeague Cup24 July 2019| average attendance = 16,229
| prevseason = 2018–19
| nextseason = 2020–21
| pattern_la1 = _heart1920h
| pattern_b1 = _heart1920h
| pattern_ra1 = _heart1920h
| pattern_sh1 = _heart1920h
| pattern_so1 = _heart1920h
| leftarm1 = 800910
| body1 = 800910
| rightarm1 = 800910
| shorts1 = FFFFFF
| socks1 = 800910
| pattern_la2 = 
| pattern_b2 = _heart1920a
| pattern_ra2 = 
| pattern_sh2 = 
| pattern_so2 = _heart1920a
| leftarm2 = DDDDDD
| body2 = DDDDDD
| rightarm2 = DDDDDD
| shorts2 = 800000
| socks2 = FFFFFF
| pattern_la3 = _heart1920t
| pattern_b3  = _heart1920t
| pattern_ra3 = _heart1920t
| pattern_sh3 = _heart1920t
| pattern_so3 = _heart1920t
| leftarm3    = 000000
| body3       = 000000
| rightarm3   = 000000
| shorts3     = 000000
| socks3      = 000000
}}
The 2019–20 season was the 123rd season of competitive football by Heart of Midlothian (Hearts) with the team participating in the Scottish Premiership. Hearts played their fifth consecutive season in the top tier of Scottish football, having been promoted from the Scottish Championship at the end of the 2014–15 season. They reached the Semi-final of the Scottish League Cup and reached the Final of the Scottish Cup.

On 13 March 2020 all SPFL leagues were indefinitely suspended due to the COVID-19 pandemic. This led to league games being postponed until at least 30 April, and later the season being ended early, resulting in 12th placed Hearts being relegated to Scottish Championship. Both Semi-finals of the Scottish Cup were postponed until later in the year -- Hearts finished as runners up, losing to Celtic in the Final.

Results and fixtures

Friendlies

Premiership

League Cup

Scottish Cup

First team player statistics

Captains
Christophe Berra continued as captain for season 2019–20, having been re-appointed as captain two seasons earlier. In January 2020, following Daniel Stendel's appointment as manager Berra was advised he was free to find a new club and was dropped from the team, later being loaned out to Dundee. Steven Naismith was then appointed as club captain, with John Souttar named as vice-captain.
{| class="wikitable" style="font-size: 95%; text-align: center;"
|-
! style="background:maroon; color:white;" scope="col" width=60|No
! style="background:maroon; color:white;" scope="col" width=60|Pos
! style="background:maroon; color:white;" scope="col" width=60|Country
! style="background:maroon; color:white;" scope="col" width=150|Name
! style="background:maroon; color:white;" scope="col" width=80|No of games
! style="background:maroon; color:white;" scope="col" width=80|Notes
|-
|6||DF||||Berra||24||Captain
|-
|14||FW||||Naismith||11||Captain
|-
|4||DF||||Souttar||1||Vice Captain
|-
|26||DF||||Halkett||3||Vice Captain

Squad information
During the 2019–20 season, Hearts have used thirty-six players in competitive games. The table below shows the number of appearances and goals scored by each player. The player statistics for the two delayed 2019–20 Scottish Cup matches have been included in the 2020–21 Heart of Midlothian F.C. season article.Last Updated 11 March 2020{| class="wikitable" style="font-size: 95%; text-align: center;"
|-
! style="background:maroon; color:white;" rowspan="2" width=60 | Number
! style="background:maroon; color:white;" rowspan="2" width=60 | Position
! style="background:maroon; color:white;" rowspan="2" width=60 | Nation
! style="background:maroon; color:white;" rowspan="2" width=150 | Name
! style="background:maroon; color:white;" colspan="2" | Totals
! style="background:maroon; color:white;" colspan="2" | Premiership
! style="background:maroon; color:white;" colspan="2" | League Cup
! style="background:maroon; color:white;" colspan="2" | Scottish Cup
|-
! style="background:maroon; color:white;" width=60 |Apps
! style="background:maroon; color:white;" width=60 |Goals
! style="background:maroon; color:white;" width=60 |Apps
! style="background:maroon; color:white;" width=60 |Goals
! style="background:maroon; color:white;" width=60 |Apps
! style="background:maroon; color:white;" width=60 |Goals
! style="background:maroon; color:white;" width=60 |Apps
! style="background:maroon; color:white;" width=60 |Goals
|-

 

  

 
Appearances (starts and substitute appearances) and goals include those in Scottish Premiership, League Cup and the Scottish Cup.

Disciplinary record
During the 2019–20 season, Hearts players have been issued with seventy-six yellow cards and five reds. The table below shows the number of cards and type shown to each player. The player statistics for the two delayed 2019–20 Scottish Cup matches have been included in the 2020–21 Heart of Midlothian F.C. season article.Last updated 11 March 2020Goal scorers
The player statistics for the two delayed 2019–20 Scottish Cup matches have been included in the 2020–21 Heart of Midlothian F.C. season article.Last updated 11 March 2020Clean sheets
{| class="wikitable" style="font-size: 95%; text-align: center;"
|-
! style="background:maroon; color:white;" scope="col" width=60|
! style="background:maroon; color:white;" scope="col" width=60|
! style="background:maroon; color:white;" scope="col" width=60|
! style="background:maroon; color:white;" scope="col" width=150|Name
! style="background:maroon; color:white;" scope="col" width=80|Premiership
! style="background:maroon; color:white;" scope="col" width=80|League Cup
! style="background:maroon; color:white;" scope="col" width=80|Scottish Cup
! style="background:maroon; color:white;" scope="col" width=80|Total
|-
|1
|GK
|
|Joel Castro Pereira
|3
|0
|2
|5
|-
|2
|GK
|
|Zdenek Zlamal
|1
|1
|1
|3
|-
|3
|GK
|
|Colin Doyle
|0
|0
|0
|0
|-
! colspan=4 | Total
!4||1||3||8

Team statistics
League table

League Cup table

Division summary

Management statisticsLast updated on 11 March 2020''

Club

Staff

Transfers

Players in

Players out

Loans in

Loans out

See also
List of Heart of Midlothian F.C. seasons

Notes

References

2019-20
Scottish football clubs 2019–20 season